Viet Thanh Nguyen (Vietnamese: Nguyễn Thanh Việt; born March 13, 1971) is a Vietnamese-American professor and novelist. He is the Aerol Arnold Chair of English and Professor of English and American Studies and Ethnicity at the University of Southern California.

Nguyen's debut novel, The Sympathizer, won the 2016 Pulitzer Prize for Fiction, the Dayton Literary Peace Prize, the Center for Fiction First Novel Prize, and many other accolades. He was awarded a MacArthur Foundation Fellowship and a Guggenheim Fellowship in 2017. Nguyen is a regular contributor, op-ed columnist for The New York Times, covering immigration, refugees, politics, culture and South East Asia. He is a Fellow of the American Academy of Arts and Sciences.

Biography
Nguyen was born in Ban Mê Thuột, Vietnam in 1971, the son of refugees from North Vietnam who moved south in 1954. After the fall of Saigon, in 1975, his family fled to the United States. Nguyen's family first settled in Fort Indiantown Gap, Pennsylvania, which was one of four American camps that accommodated refugees from Vietnam. Nguyen's family then moved to Harrisburg, Pennsylvania until 1978.

His family later moved to San Jose, California, where they opened up a Vietnamese grocery store, one of the first of its kind in the area. He often enjoyed reading literature about the Vietnam War, preferably those from the Vietnamese perspectives, which were rather rare at the time in comparison with the overwhelming amount of the American narratives. While growing up in San Jose, Nguyen attended St. Patrick School, a Catholic elementary school, and went on to Bellarmine College Preparatory.

Nguyen then briefly attended the University of California campuses at Riverside and Los Angeles before finally deciding to finish his studies at Berkeley, from where he graduated Phi Beta Kappa in May 1992 with a Bachelor of Arts (B.A.) degree in English and Ethnic Studies. He went on to receive his Ph.D. in English from Berkeley in May 1997. That year, he moved to Los Angeles for a teaching position as an assistant professor at the University of Southern California in both the English Department, and in the American Studies and Ethnicity Department. In 2003, he became an associate professor in the two departments.

In addition to teaching and writing, Nguyen also serves as cultural critic-at-large for The Los Angeles Times and is an editor of diaCRITICS, a blog for the Diasporic Vietnamese Artists Network.

He lives in Pasadena with his wife, Lan Duong, and their two children.

Nguyen also uses the platform he has gained from his writing accolades to step up on social platforms, using his markers of traditional success to be a leading voice of the Vietnamese American community. He gives non-Vietnamese US-Americans context for the story of Vietnamese in the United States today, as well as being a leader for Asian US-American youth as he talks about what the term "Asian-American" means to him. He also wants to educate Asians to solidarity with other groups. As attention to the Black Lives Matter movement surged in 2020, so did the anti-Blackness present in the Asian and Vietnamese communities and Nguyen has said that "immigrants and refugees who come into this country...may have to start off near the bottom in American society... But they know, very rapidly... that the bottom in this country is occupied by black people. And so if they can participate in anti-black racism, it brings them one step closer to assimilation." In this way, "being anti-black or not being black as a way of getting ahead in this country. So even if we share some similarities, an experience with African Americans, we have a way out if we want to take it, that involves allying ourselves with whiteness, that is a lot harder for most black people to do." As he grows Asians' understanding of differences and struggles of other groups, and the reality of Asians to others, he powerfully grows solidarity and empathy through education.

Writing

Novels
Nguyen's debut novel, The Sympathizer was published in 2015 by the Grove Press/Atlantic. The Sympathizer won the 2016 Pulitzer Prize for Fiction. The Sympathizer further won the Center for Fiction First Novel Prize, the Carnegie Medal for Excellence in Fiction from the American Library Association, and the Asian/Pacific American Award for Literature in Fiction from the Asian/Pacific American Librarians Association. The book additionally won the Edgar Award for Best First Novel from an American Author from the Mystery Writers of America, and was a finalist in the PEN/Faulkner Award for Fiction, and the PEN/Robert W. Bingham Prize for Debut Fiction. The novel has also won the Dayton Literary Peace Prize. The New York Times included The Sympathizer among the Book Review'''s "Editors' Choice" selection of new books when the book debuted, and in its list of "Notable Books of 2015". The novel also made it onto numerous other "Books of the Year" lists, including those of The Guardian, The Wall Street Journal, Slate.com, Amazon.com and The Washington Post. Nguyen's second novel, The Committed, which continues the story of The Sympathizer, was published in 2021.

Short stories
Nguyen's short fiction has been published in Best New American Voices 2007 ("A Correct Life: Một Cuộc Sống Đứng Đắn"), Manoa ("Better Homes and Gardens"), Narrative Magazine ("Someone Else Besides You", "Arthur Arellano" and "Fatherland", which was a prize winner in the 2011 Winter Fiction Contest), TriQuarterly ("The War Years" - Issue 135/136), The Good Men Project ("Look At Me") the Chicago Tribune ("The Americans", also a 2010 Nelson Algren Short Story Awards finalist), and Gulf Coast, where his story won the 2007 Fiction Prize.

Nguyen is one of the contributing authors of A Stranger Among Us: Stories of Cross-Cultural Collision and Connection published by OV Books, Other Voices, Inc. in May 2008.

Nguyen released a book of short stories, published by Grove Press in February 2017 entitled The Refugees.

Non-fiction
Nguyen is the editor of The Displaced: Refugee Writers on Refugee Lives, which includes essays by 17 fellow refugee writers from Mexico, Bosnia, Iran, Afghanistan, Soviet Ukraine, Hungary, Chile, and Ethiopia, among other countries.

Nguyen has also released a non-fiction book published by the Harvard University Press in March 2016 entitled Nothing Ever Dies: Vietnam and the Memory of War described on his website as "the critical bookend to a creative project whose fictional bookend was The Sympathizer". According to Nguyen's website, the book Nothing Ever Dies "examines how the so-called Vietnam War has been remembered by many countries and people, from the US to Vietnam, Laos, Cambodia, and South Korea." Kirkus Reviews has also called the book "a powerful reflection on how we choose to remember and forget." The book is a National Book Award finalist.

In 2002, Nguyen published a treatise entitled Race and Resistance: Literature and Politics in Asian America (Oxford University Press). Nguyen has also co-edited a treatise entitled Transpacific Studies: Framing an Emerging Field (University of Hawaii Press, 2014) along with Janet Hoskins.

Nguyen's non-fiction articles and essays have appeared in journals and books, including PMLA, American Literary History, Western American Literature, positions: east asia cultures critique, The New Centennial Review, Postmodern Culture, The Japanese Journal of American Studies, and Asian American Studies After Critical Mass. In an opinion column in the New York Times, Nguyen discussed having been a refugee and characterized refugees as heroic.

 Children's 
Nguyen and illustrator Thi Bui, along with their respective children, collaborated on a children's book titled Chicken of the Sea.

Accolades
Nguyen has also been a fellow of the American Council of Learned Societies (2011–2012), the Radcliffe Institute for Advanced Study at Harvard (2008–2009) and the Fine Arts Work Center (2004–2005). He has also received residencies, fellowships, and grants from the Luce Foundation, the Mellon Foundation, the Asian Cultural Council, the James Irvine Foundation, the Huntington Library, the Djerassi Artists Residency, the Bread Loaf Writers’ Conference, Creative Capital and the Warhol Foundation.

His teaching and service awards include the Mellon Mentoring Award for Faculty Mentoring Graduate Students, the Albert S. Raubenheimer Distinguished Junior Faculty Award for outstanding research, teaching and service, the General Education Teaching Award, and the Resident Faculty of the Year Award. Multimedia has also been a key part of his teaching: In a recent course on the American War in Viet Nam, he and his students created An Other War Memorial, which won a grant from the Fund for Innovative Undergraduate Teaching and the USC Provost's Prize for Teaching with Technology.

Bibliography

NovelsThe Sympathizer (2015) (Grove/Atlantic)
Winner, 2016 Pulitzer Prize for Fiction
Winner, 2016 Dayton Literary Peace Prize
Winner, 2016 Carnegie Medal for Excellence in Fiction
Winner, 2016 Edgar Award for Best First Novel
Winner, 2015 Center for Fiction First Novel Prize
Winner, 2015 Asian/Pacific American Award for Literature
Finalist, 2016 PEN/Faulkner Award for Fiction
Shortlisted, 2017 International Dublin Literary Award

Non-fictionNothing Ever Dies: Vietnam and The Memory of War (2016) (Harvard University Press)
Finalist, 2016 National Book Award for NonfictionRace and Resistance: Literature and Politics in Asian America (2002) (Oxford University Press)

Short storiesThe RefugeesHonor, 2017 Asian/Pacific American Award for Literature
The collection includes the following stories:
"A Correct Life: Một Cuộc Sống Đứng Đắn", Best New American Voices 2007 (pg. 97)
Translated on Damau.org on October 8, 2006
"Someone Else Besides You", Narrative Magazine, Winter 2008
"Arthur Arellano", Narrative Magazine, Spring 2010
"Fatherland", Narrative Magazine, Spring 2011
3rd Place Winner, 2011 Winter Fiction Contest
"The War Years", TriQuarterly - Issue 135/136 (2010) pp. 79–93
"Look At Me", The Good Men Project, Feb. 19 2011
"The Americans", The Chicago Tribune - Link
2010 Nelson Algren Short Story Awards Finalist
"The Other Woman" Gulf Coast: A Journal of Literature and Fine Arts, Winter 2007/Spring 2008, Vol. 20 Issue 1, pg. 193
Winner, 2007 Fiction Prize
Reprinted in A Stranger Among Us: Stories of Cross-Cultural Collision and Connection (University of Illinois Press)

Children's BookChicken of the Sea (2019) (McSweeney's Publishing) ISBN 194421173X (with illustrator Thi Bui)

References

External links

USC Official faculty profile
Viet Thanh Nguyen comes out for Palestinian rights
Viet Thanh Nguyen: A Bibliography, First Editions''

Living people
1971 births
21st-century American novelists
21st-century American short story writers
Academics of Vietnamese descent
American male short story writers
American writers of Vietnamese descent
American children's writers
Vietnamese children's writers
People from Đắk Lắk Province
People from Lebanon County, Pennsylvania
Pulitzer Prize for Fiction winners
Refugees in the United States
University of California, Berkeley alumni
University of Southern California faculty
Vietnamese emigrants to the United States
Vietnamese refugees
Writers from San Jose, California
MacArthur Fellows
PEN/Faulkner Award for Fiction winners
21st-century American male writers
Novelists from Pennsylvania
Fellows of the American Academy of Arts and Sciences